Riacho He-Hé is a settlement in northern Argentina. It is located in the Pilcomayo Department of Formosa Province.

Populated places in Formosa Province